Jan Novák (born 5 April 1960 in Gottwaldov) is a Czech former handball player who competed in the 1988 Summer Olympics.

References

1960 births
Living people
Czech male handball players
Olympic handball players of Czechoslovakia
Handball players at the 1988 Summer Olympics
Czechoslovak male handball players
Sportspeople from Zlín